Wafiq Ajeel Homood al-Samarrai (1 July 1947 – 29 August 2022) was an Iraqi general who was chief of the country's general military intelligence.

Military career
Al-Samarrai served as the deputy of the Military Intelligence Director in 1988 during the Anfal Genocide, in the Iraqi Intelligence during the Iran–Iraq War and was appointed head of Military Intelligence Agency in 1990.

Defection
He defected in December 1994 and drove up to Kirkuk, then walked for 30 hours to cross the frontier into the Northern Kurdish enclave. At first he allied himself with Ahmad Chalabi, the leader of the Iraqi National Congress. They fomented a mini war in March 1995 between Kurdish groups and the Iraqi Army that went wrong when the insurgents failed to secure American military air support. Al-Samarrai moved to Syria and eventually made his way to London in 1998, where he headed an opposition group called the Higher Council for National Salvation which is based in Denmark.

Following his defection, Qusay Hussein told senior Iraqi officials, including Ra'ad al-Hamdani, that al-Samarrai had been an undercover agent for Jalal Talabani and Iran since 1982. Former Maj. Gen. Mizher Rashid al-Tarfa al-Ubaydi of Iraqi Intelligence claimed that al-Samarrai fled because he believed he was about to be arrested.

Post invasion of Iraq
In 2003, he returned to his hometown Samarra, Iraq and remained there until he was appointed the national security advisor to President Jalal Talabani in 2005 and moved to the Green Zone in Baghdad. He was relieved of his post in 2008 after the discovery of documents implicating him in the Iraqi forces' operations against rebels in the 1991 uprisings.

On 6 March 2008, the Iraqi presidency website publicized a judicial decision to lift off all restrictions imposed on General Wafiq al-Samarrai, including a freeze on his assets, after Supreme Criminal Court Judge Adnan Al Badri reportedly announced that a probe found no evidence implicating al-Samarrai in 1991 Iraqi Army attacks on Kurds and Shia. However, Samarrai left for London and announced that he will not return to Iraq in the future.

On 29 August 2022, he died in London, a year after he had been admitted to hospitals there, while suffering from cancer.

References

External links
 General plots Saddam's downfall step-by-step, The Telegraph
 قرار قضائي ينفي أي مسؤولية جنائية عن الفريق أول الركن وفيق السامرائي ويلزم برفع كل القيود عنه, iraqipresidency.net

1947 births
2022 deaths
Iraqi defectors
Iraqi emigrants to the United Kingdom
Iraqi generals
People from Samarra